Charlotte Lake is a lake in Todd County, in the U.S. state of Minnesota.

Charlotte Lake was named for Charlotte O. Van Cleve, the wife of an early settler.

See also
List of lakes in Minnesota

References

Lakes of Minnesota
Lakes of Todd County, Minnesota